The Copa del Rey 2002-03 was the 66th edition of the Spanish basketball Cup. It was organized by the ACB and was held in Valencia at the Pabellón Municipal Fuente de San Luis between 20 and 23 February 2003. The winning team was FC Barcelona after defeating defending champions Tau Cerámica after an overtime.

Brackett

Final

MVP of the Tournament:  Dejan Bodiroga

See also
ACB
Copa del Rey de Baloncesto

External links
Results and stats of Copa del Rey 2003 

Copa del Rey de Baloncesto
2002–03 in Spanish basketball